Whorouly is a town in northeast Victoria, Australia. Its name is possibly derived from an Aboriginal word meaning a black (or red) cockatoo, although another suggestion is that it means "underwater".

Prior to the 1994 council amalgamations by the Kennett Government (and the creation of the Rural City of Wangaratta), the township was in the disbanded Shire of Oxley.

The town can easily be missed, being sited off the two main valley highways, between the Snow Road (the C522 which runs from an interchange on the M31 Hume Freeway) and The Great Alpine Road (B500), which runs between Wangaratta and Omeo. It is, however, only five minutes from either road.

The town was surveyed and proclaimed in 1868, adopting the name of a nearby station. Whorouly Primary School opened in 1874. The first European settlers established large grazing properties but after the Victorian gold rush, closer settlement took place. Land was released in  lots, on the condition that part of the land was cleared for agriculture.

Until the 1980s, much of the area along the Ovens River was planted with tobacco. Other primary products in the area included beef and dairy cattle, orchards and market gardens. In recent years, wine grape growing has been introduced meaning that the area, being at the apex of the Ovens Valley and King Valley, is the centre of a significant food region, with many farm gate and cellar door sales.

The local Australian rules football team, Whorouly Football Club, competes in the Ovens and King Football League.

Town facilities currently include churches, a children's playground, a sporting ground and a public hall, a combined primary school and pre-school, a combined hotel/pub/general store, a local well renowned cafe called The 2 Cooks Cafe  and several self-catering holiday rentals and B&B's. There is also a garage with fuel facilities. The garage was known as Whorouly Motors, but recently changed its name to Alpine Performance  to focus on supporting the growing performance car and motorbike market in the region.

References

Towns in Victoria (Australia)
Rural City of Wangaratta